Čechie is the personification of the Czech nation, which was used in the 19th century as reaction on personification of competing nationalism represented by Germania or Austria.

See also 
Flag and Coat of arms of the Czech Republic
Czech Vašek, personification of the Czechs
Deutscher Michel, personification of the German people

References

National personifications
National symbols of the Czech Republic